Leyan Andrew Lo (born November 24, 1985) held the world record of 11.13 seconds for the fastest Rubik's Cube solve until Toby Mao in 2006 had a solve of 10.48 at the U.S. nationals competition in San Francisco. Leyan appeared on The Tonight Show with Jay Leno, where he solved a Rubik's Cube in 18.9 seconds. He also holds the former world record for the fastest blindfolded Rubik's Cube solve, at 1:28.82.

Not only a former and current world champion, Leyan teaches different methods of solving the Rubik's Cube.  On his website, one can find multiple methods of solving a Rubik's Cube, including algorithms and diagrams for a "Beginners' Solution", and "Speedcubing", and algorithms for "Blindfold Cubing".  Keys for how to interpret the different algorithm annotations can be found at the top of the "Beginners' Solution" page.

Leyan graduated from California Institute of Technology in June 2007 with a Bachelor of Science in Physics.

In 2011, Leyan was selected to be among 101 musicians to perform in the YouTube Symphony Orchestra on violin.

References
Man solves Rubik’s Cube in 11.13 seconds Associated Press NBC News Updated: 11:48 a.m. ET Jan 15, 2006 
 Leyan Lo's website:  http://www.leyanlo.com/

External links
 Leyan's web site at Stanford
 Leyan's Xanga 
 Leyan's official results
 Leyan's LiveJournal
 
 Video of 11.13 world record solve 
 Video of 1:28.82 world record blindfolded solve

1985 births
Living people
American speedcubers
California Institute of Technology alumni